Eric Lesbirel (born 1951) is a former association football player who represented New Zealand at international level.

Lesbirel played two official A-international matches for the New Zealand in 1977, both against New Caledonia, the first a 3–0 win on 5 March, the second three days later a 4–0 win on 8 March 1977.

References 

1951 births
Living people
Wellington United players
British emigrants to New Zealand
New Zealand association footballers
New Zealand international footballers
Association footballers not categorized by position